Heracles of Macedon (c. 327 – 309 BC) was a reputed illegitimate son of Alexander the Great of Macedon by Barsine, daughter of Satrap Artabazus of Phrygia. Heracles was named after the Greek mythological hero of the same name, from whom the Argeads claimed descent.

History
It cannot be established definitively whether Heracles was Alexander's son or not. Of the ancient sources, both Plutarch and Justin mention Barsine and Heracles but Arrian in the Alexander's Anabasis mentions neither. Plutarch recounts that Alexander took Barsine as his mistress, but on the arguably spurious grounds that she was recommended to him by Parmenion (despite the many disagreements between him and Alexander, and Alexander's apparent contempt for his judgement). Of Barsine, Mary Renault states that:

If Heracles were Alexander's illegitimate child, then it also raises the pointed question as to why he, as Alexander's only living son at the time of his death, was not immediately drawn into the succession disputes, and why he was passed over in favour of Philip Arrhidaeus – himself illegitimate – who was only a son of Alexander's father Philip, and thus a more distant claimant than Heracles. Renault concludes that the romance with Barsine was invented retrospectively to validate Heracles' parentage.

On Alexander's death Nearchus, who was then son-in-law of Barsine, advocated for Heracles' inheritance, but was unsuccessful.

Either way, Heracles lived in obscurity until Alexander IV's murder by Cassander in 310 BC or 309 BC. At that point Polyperchon, a regent of Macedon who had been replaced by Cassander and had all but disappeared for the previous six years, began championing Heracles as Alexander's true heir, and Polyperchon began forming an army. Instead of fighting, Cassander negotiated with Polyperchon. By offering Polyperchon various bribes such as a sinecure and a large number of talents, Cassander persuaded him to murder Heracles, and Polyperchon retired to obscurity once more.

Family tree

References

External links 
A detailed biography of Heracles' mother Barsine
Children of Alexander III the Great on Web Archive (Pothos.org 2011)
A genealogical tree of Heracles

4th-century BC Macedonians
Family of Alexander the Great
Ancient Macedonians
People who died under the regency of Cassander
Murdered royalty of Macedonia (ancient kingdom)
320s BC births
309 BC deaths
Greek people of Iranian descent